Statistics of Belgian First Division in the 1949–50 season.

Overview

It was contested by 16 teams, and R.S.C. Anderlecht won the championship.

League standings

Results

References

Belgian Pro League seasons
1949–50 in Belgian football
Belgian